Blaggards are an American Celtic rock band from Houston, Texas. The Houston Press has described them as "H-town's heir to the emerald throne of Phil Lynott and Shane MacGowan".

History
Blaggards are led by guitarist and singer Patrick Devlin, who grew up in Dublin, Ireland listening to Irish rebel music and heavy metal bands like Black Sabbath and Iron Maiden.

After moving to Houston in 1994, Devlin fronted an Irish rock band called On The Dole for several years  before starting Blaggards in July 2004 with bass player Chad Smalley (son of Nobel laureate Richard Smalley), violinist Turi Hoiseth, and drummer Brian Vogel. Hoiseth and Vogel have since left the band, leaving Devlin and Smalley as the only original members.

Blaggards have toured nationally  and internationally, and performed at South by Southwest 2008, where they were the only Celtic-based act on the official schedule.

Their music has been played on the Sirius Satellite Radio program Celtic Crush, hosted by Larry Kirwan of Black 47.  In 2013 he included their recording of The Irish Rover on his compilation album Larry Kirwan's Celtic Invasion.

The song "Big Strong Man" from Blaggards' first album Standards appears in the 2010 British film The Kid, directed by Nick Moran.

“Big Strong Man” and "Drunken Sailor" (also from Standards) were both featured in episode 86 of the CBS series The Good Wife, aired on March 24, 2013.

Members 

 Patrick Devlin - Vocals and guitar
 Chad Smalley - Vocals and bass

Discography 

Standards (2005)
    1. Drunken Sailor
    2. Bog Songs
    3. Big Strong Man (Yakety Sax)
    4. Prison Love Songs (Folsom Prison Blues/ The Fields of Athenry)
    5. Slapper's Medley
    6. Foggy Dew
    7. Botany Bay
    8. Rocky Road to Dublin
    9. Suspicious Minds
    10. Irish Rover
Live in Texas (2010)
    1. Waxie's Dargle (Live)
    2. Whiskey in the Jar (Live)
    3. Rocky Road to Dublin (Live)
    4. Spancil Hill (Live)
    5. Slapper's Medley (Live)
    6. Leaving of Liverpool (Live)
    7. Botany Bay (Live)
    8. Foggy Dew (Live)
    9. Big Strong Man (Live)
    10. Drunken Sailor (Live)
    11. Bog Songs (Live)
    12. Wild Rover (Live)
    13. Irish Rover (Live)

References

External links
 Official website
 Review of "Standards" in the Austin Chronicle
 Review of "Standards" at Askew Reviews
 Paddy Rock Radio's Top Celtic Rock & Punk CD’s of 2005
 Article in Connect Savannah Online
 Article in The Boston Globe about the word "blaggard" that mentions the band
 Article about Blaggards on MetalMartyr.com

Musical groups from Houston
Celtic punk groups